Thomas Gordon Dahms (April 19, 1927 – November 30, 1988) was an American football player and coach.  He played in the National Football League (NFL) as an offensive tackle for seven seasons with the Los Angeles Rams, Green Bay Packers, Chicago Cardinals, and San Francisco 49ers. After his playing career, he served as assistant coach in the NFL with the Dallas Cowboys and the Oakland Raiders. He played college football at San Diego State College.

Early years
Dahms attended San Diego High School, before moving on to San Diego State College and playing tackle. In 1949, he received All-American and Little-All Coast honors.

In 1991, he was inducted into the San Diego State University Athletics Hall of Fame.

Professional career
In 1951, he signed with the Los Angeles Rams, where he played offensive tackle and helped the team win an NFL Championship.

Coaching career
Dahms was a line coach at the San Diego Naval Training Center. In 1958, he was the athletic director at San Diego Junior High. After one year he took over as the line coach at the University of Virginia in 1959.

In 1960, he joined the Dallas Cowboys for their inaugural season, becoming the first defensive line coach in franchise history. After two years in Dallas, he accepted the same position with the Oakland Raiders under head coach Al Davis in 1963, remaining with the team until 1978. He was an assistant with the semipro football team Yuba City Cougars. In 1986, he was hired as the head coach at Mountain Empire High School.

Personal life
Dahms appeared in "Crazylegs" a film about Elroy Hirsch.

References

External links
Tom Dahms Adjusts to Life in Slow Lane : Ex-Ram Player and Raider Assistant Is Now Coaching a Small High School

1927 births
1988 deaths
American football offensive tackles
Chicago Cardinals players
Dallas Cowboys coaches
Dallas Cowboys scouts
Green Bay Packers players
Los Angeles Rams players
Oakland Raiders coaches
San Diego State Aztecs football players
San Francisco 49ers players
Virginia Cavaliers football coaches
Players of American football from San Diego

San Diego High School alumni